Hypocaccus gaudens is a species of clown beetle in the family Histeridae. It is found in Central America, North America, and South America.

References

Further reading

 

Histeridae
Articles created by Qbugbot
Beetles described in 1851